Shalma (also Romanized as Shālmā) is a village in Ahmadsargurab Rural District, Ahmadsargurab District, Shaft County, Gilan Province, Iran. At the 2006 census, its population was 996, in 265 families.

References 

Populated places in Shaft County